The Kankakee, Beaverville and Southern Railroad Company  is a Class III railroad serving agricultural communities in east-central Illinois and west-central Indiana.

History
In December 1977, Conrail was set to abandon  of their ex-New York Central Railroad trackage between Kankakee and Sheldon, Illinois, when instead it was purchased by Beaverville businessman Fey Orr to service his lumber and agricultural products industry based there. Eighty miles of the bankrupt Chicago, Milwaukee, St. Paul and Pacific Railroad (Milwaukee Road's) trackage from just north of Donovan and Danville were purchased in 1981. These two lines cross near Iroquois. The Norfolk Southern abandoned its ex-New York, Chicago and St. Louis Railroad trackage between Cheneyville, Illinois (north of Danville) Boswell, Indiana and Lafayette, Indiana, which KBSR purchased in 1991. Several other abandonments occurred in the area by Class I railroads which the Kankakee, Beaverville were able to capitalize on.

On July 16, 1997, company founder Fey Orr died at 85.  Vice President Kevin Stroo then took over as President of the KB&S until his death in 2009. Current President is Tyler Stroo. Vice-President is Neil Stroo.

Operations
The Kankakee, Beaverville and Southern is privately owned, and serves the various small communities it passes through and their primarily agricultural industries.  In recent years it was considered unusual in that it continued to roster Alco diesel locomotives decades after their builder's demise, and became all the more popular amongst railfans for it. However, in December 2003, the KB&S received a group of six EMD GP38-2M locomotives rebuilt from ex-New York Central Railroad GP40s. The railroad named each of these engines after employees.

The KB&S  makes numerous connections to other railroads:
 Bee Line Railroad - at Handy, east of Ambia, Indiana
 Canadian National Railway - at Kankakee
 CSX Transportation - at Danville and Lafayette
 Norfolk Southern - at Danville, Kankakee and Lafayette
 Toledo, Peoria and Western Railway - at Webster and Sheldon
 Union Pacific Railroad - at St. Anne, Illinois

Locomotive maintenance is conducted at the road shops at Iroquois Junction.

External links

  Kankakee, Beaverville & Southern Railroad
 Kankakee Beaverville and Southern Unofficial Website
 Shortlines of Chicago Historical Society - KB&S

Illinois railroads
Indiana railroads
Transportation in Iroquois County, Illinois
Transportation in Kankakee County, Illinois
Transportation in Vermilion County, Illinois
Transportation in Benton County, Indiana
Transportation in Newton County, Indiana
Transportation in Tippecanoe County, Indiana
Spin-offs of Conrail